Joseph Jerome Cannon (born July 13, 1953) is a former outfielder in Major League Baseball.  Born in Camp Lejeune, North Carolina, he grew up in Anne Arundel County in Maryland. Cannon was a first round draft pick by the Houston Astros in 1974 out of Pensacola State College. Cannon spent parts of four seasons in the majors with the Astros and the Toronto Blue Jays.

Upon his retirement as a player, Cannon became a minor league coach and manager.  He managed for 11 seasons in the Toronto, Atlanta, and Houston organizations, taking the Lexington Legends to their first championship in their inaugural season in 2001. His most recent baseball job, 2007-2009, was as the field coach for the Frederick Keys, the Carolina League affiliate of the Baltimore Orioles. In 2015 he was working at the Kentucky Methodist Group Home in Versailles, Kentucky, mentoring teenage boys.

In 1991, Anne Arundel County named Joe Cannon Stadium in Hanover, Maryland after Cannon.

Cannon usually appears on baseball cards as "J.J. Cannon."

References

External links

Pura Pelota (Venezuelan Winter League)

1953 births
Living people
African-American baseball players
American expatriate baseball players in Canada
Baseball players from North Carolina
Cedar Rapids Astros players
Charleston Charlies players
Columbus Astros players
Covington Astros players
Dubuque Packers players
Houston Astros players
Kinston Blue Jays players
Knoxville Blue Jays players
Major League Baseball outfielders
Minor league baseball coaches
Minor league baseball managers
Navegantes del Magallanes players
American expatriate baseball players in Venezuela
People from Anne Arundel County, Maryland
People from Jacksonville, North Carolina
Pensacola State Pirates baseball players
Syracuse Chiefs players
Toronto Blue Jays players
20th-century African-American sportspeople